This list of tallest buildings in Nanjing ranks skyscrapers in Nanjing, in Jiangsu, China by height.

Nanjing is the second and a sub-provincial city in Jiangsu Province, with total of 7.7 million in population. It is the second largest commercial centre in the East China region, after Shanghai.

Tallest buildings

This includes spires and architectural details but does not include antenna masts. Existing structures are included for ranking purposes based on present height.

Tallest under construction, approved, and proposed

Under construction
This list buildings that are under construction in Nanjing and that are planned to rise at least . Buildings that have already been topped out are included.

Proposed
This list buildings that are proposed in Nanjing and that are planned to rise at least . Buildings that have already been topped out are included.

References

External links
 Tallest buildings of Nanjing on Emporis
 Buildings of Nanjing on Skyscraperpage
 Skyscrapers of Nanjing on Gaoloumi (in Chinese)

Nanjing
Buildings and structures in Nanjing